The chieftain called by Latins Donnus was the ruler of the Ligurian tribes inhabiting the mountainous region now known as the Cottian Alps during the 1st century BC. Although initially an opponent of Julius Caesar during the latter's conquest of Gaul, Donnus later made peace with him.
Donnus' son and successor, Cottius, initially maintained his independence in the face of Augustus' effort to subdue the various Alpine tribes, but afterwards agreed to an alliance, and the family continued to rule the region as prefects of Rome, until Nero annexed the dominion as the province of Alpes Cottiae.
His name was first cited in the Arch of Augustus of Susa engraving.

See also
 Alpes Cottiae (the original Roman province)
 Cottian Alps
 Cottius
 Arch of Augustus (Susa)
 Susa, Piedmont

References

2. Bartolomasi N. (1975) - Valsusa Antica - Alzani

1st-century BC rulers in Europe